The following is a list of episodes of the A&E reality television series Duck Dynasty.  The series is set in West Monroe, Louisiana and stars Willie Robertson, CEO of Duck Commander, a duck call company, and his family and co-workers.

Series overview

Episodes

Season 1 (2012)

Season 2 (2012)

Season 3 (2013)

Season 4 (2013)

Season 5 (2014)

Season 6 (2014)

Season 7 (2014–2015)

Season 8 (2015)

Season 9 (2016)

Season 10 (2016)

Season 11 (2016–2017)

References

Lists of American non-fiction television series episodes